Aziz Tafer (born June 17, 1984) is a French-Algerian former footballer.

Career
He played with the squad number 26 for CS Constantine in the Algerian Ligue 1, the manager of the team being Roger Lemerre. In July 2014, he joined the Grenoble Foot 38 in the French fourth division CFA.

Honours
ES Sétif
Algerian League: 2006–07
Arab Champions League: 2006–07

References

External links

Aziz Tafer Interview

1984 births
Algerian footballers
French footballers
French sportspeople of Algerian descent
AS Monaco FC players
SV Elversberg players
IFK Norrköping players
FC Gloria Buzău players
CS Constantine players
Grenoble Foot 38 players
Expatriate footballers in Algeria
Liga I players
Living people
Association football fullbacks
Association football midfielders